Patia rhetes is a butterfly in the family Pieridae. It is found in Colombia, Bolivia, and Ecuador.

References

Dismorphiinae
Butterflies described in 1857
Pieridae of South America
Taxa named by William Chapman Hewitson